Asif is an Arabic masculine given name. In Persian and Urdu it is often pronounced as 'Asif' or 'Asef' though the original form is 'Asaf'. This name referred to Solomon's vizier in the Islamic tradition, and by extension to a wise, prudential figure. It was originally borrowed from the Hebrew name Asaf (אסף) meaning "gather, harvest" (lit. "he gathered.")

People with this name

In antiquity
 Asif bin Barkhiya, described in the 27th Chapter of the Qur'an, transported the throne of the Queen of Sheba

In modern times
 Asif Ahmad Ali (1940–2022), Pakistani politician and government minister, Foreign Minister 1993–1996
 Asif Ahmad, British diplomat
 Asif Akbar, Bangladeshi singer
 Asif Ali (disambiguation), multiple people
 Asif Bashir Bhagat, Pakistani politician
 Asif Din, English cricketer
 Asif Farrukhi, Pakistani doctor, writer and translator
 Asif Ismail, Indian tennis player
 Asif Kapadia, English film director
 Asif Maharammov, Azerbaijani Lieutenant colonel and National Hero of Azerbaijan
 Asif Nawaz, Pakistani general
 Asif Noorani, Pakistani newspaper and television writer
 Asif Iqbal Razvi, Pakistani cricketer
 Asif  Ali Zardari, Pakistan's former president (2008–2013)

Surname
 K. Asif, Indian film director
 Khawaja Muhammad Asif, Pakistani politician
 Mohammad Asif, Pakistan cricketer

See also 
 Assaf (name)
 Asaf

Arabic masculine given names
Pakistani masculine given names